Borca di Cadore is a comune (municipality) in the province of Belluno in the Italian region of Veneto, located about  north of Venice and about  north of Belluno.

References

External links 
 Pro Loco di Borca di Cadore

Cities and towns in Veneto